Wooden Descent of the Holy Spirit Church was built in suburb of Potelych, Ukraine in 1502 on the place of a church that was burned down by tatars. It is the oldest wooden church in Lviv Oblast. Church was visited by Bohdan Khmelnytsky.

The structure consists of three wooden naves and a brick sacristy.

On June 21, 2013, on the 37th Session of the UNESCO World Heritage Committee in Cambodia the Holy Trinity Church was added to the UNESCO World Heritage List among 16 wooden tserkvas of Carpathian Region in Poland and Ukraine.

References 

Wooden tserkvas of Carpathian region in Poland and Ukraine
World Heritage Sites in Ukraine
Churches completed in 1745
Ukrainian Catholic churches in Ukraine